The 2014 Lima Challenger was a professional tennis tournament played on clay courts. It was the eighth edition of the tournament which is part of the 2014 ATP Challenger Tour. It took place in Lima, Peru between November 15 and November 23, 2014.

Singles main-draw entrants

Seeds

 1 Rankings are as of November 10, 2014.

Other entrants
The following players received wildcards into the singles main draw:
  Sergio Galdós
  Jorge Brian Panta
  Rodrigo Sánchez
  Juan Pablo Varillas

The following players received entry from the qualifying draw:
  Alan Kohen
  Michael Linzer
  Guillermo Rivera Aránguiz
  Edmundo Ulloa

Champions

Singles

  Guido Pella def.  Jason Kubler, 6–2, 6–4

Doubles

  Sergio Galdós /  Guido Pella def.  Marcelo Demoliner /  Roberto Maytín, 6–3, 6–1

External links
Official Website

Lima Challenger
Lima Challenger
November 2014 sports events in South America
2014 in Peruvian sport